This is a list of earthquakes in 2000. Only earthquakes of magnitude 6 or above are included, unless they result in damage and/or casualties, or are notable for some other reason.  All dates are listed according to UTC time.

Compared to other years

Overall

By death toll

 Note: At least 10 casualties

By magnitude

 Note: At least 7.0 magnitude

By month

January

At least 5 deaths and 2,528 injuries.
 A magnitude 6.8 earthquake struck Kuril Islands, on January 28 at a depth .

February

At least 1 death and 15 injuries were reported.

March

April

May

Forty-six people were killed and 264 others were injured, most of them in Luwuk.
One person was killed in a mining accident in Atacama, Chile.
Three people were killed and thirteen others had injuries

June

It is the deadliest earthquake in 2000.
Killing two people and injuring eighty others.
One person was killed and further damage was caused.
Two people were killed and 36 others were injured.
Injuring one person.

July

One person was killed.

August

Eight people were injured, and 1,390 buildings were damaged, leaving 19,100 homeless.
It was the largest earthquake by magnitude during this month.
One person was injured and some buildings were damaged in Lázaro Cárdenas, Michoacán.
Two cars were damaged by falling rocks in Kozushima and caused a small landslide in Nii-jima.
Damage was reported in the North Khorasan province of Iran.
It was an aftershock of the 6.8 magnitude earthquake 33 minutes before.
It was an aftershock of the 6.8 magnitude earthquake 4 hours prior.
It was an aftershock of the 6.8 magnitude earthquake 4 hours prior.

September

Minor damage was observed in Hualien City.
One death occurred as a result of the earthquake in the province. 

October

At least 6 were injured and around 157 houses were damaged or destroyed.
Minor damage was reported in Trinidad and Tobago.
At least 130 people were injured, 104 houses destroyed, 7 bridges collapsed, 2,230 buildings sustained damages, and 60 landslides were observed as a result of the earthquake.
Minor damage was observed on the western part of the Island of Java.
Seven people were injured as a result of the earthquake.

November

Two were injured from the earthquake and 86 buildings were damaged.
Two people were killed by the earthquake, one in the Béjaïa Province, and one in the Sétif Province. Another 12 were injured and at least 7 buildings were destroyed.
Two were killed because of the earthquake, one in New Ireland (island) and one in the Duke of York Islands. At least 5,000 were made homeless and a tsunami of 3 meters was recorded. This was the largest earthquake of the year.
It was an aftershock of the 8.0, 3 hours prior.
It was an aftershock of the 8.0, 3 hours prior.
It was an aftershock of the 8.0, from the day prior.
It was an aftershock of the 8.0, from 2 days prior.
It was an aftershock of the 8.0, from 2 days prior.
In total, 31 were killed as a result of the earthquake, 5 by falling debris, 23 more from heart attacks, with another 3 dying the following day due to an explosion from a pipe leaking natural gas. More than 430 were injured as a result of the earthquake.
It was an aftershock of the 6.8 from a minute prior.
Minor damage was reported in the region.
Damage was recorded in Anderson and Clear.

December

Unconfirmed reports stated 11 people were killed as a result of the earthquake.
It was an aftershock of the 8.0 from the month prior.
Six were reported killed and 41 were injured.  
It was an aftershock of the 8.0 from the month prior.
It was an aftershock of the 8.0 from the month prior.

References

2000
 
2000 natural disasters
2000